Baba Abdulai Musah (born 18 December 1996) is a Ghanaian professional footballer who plays as defender for Ghana Premier League side Medeama S.C. He previously had stints with Tema Youth and Nania FC.

Career

Early career 
Musah played for lower-tier side Nania FC for two seasons before moving to Tema Youth.

Tema Youth 
In 2017, he moved to Tema Youth. He played there for three seasons from 2017 to 2020. He featured for them when they played in the 2017 Ghana Premier League season. He played in 17 league matches that season, with Tema Youth placing 14th and being relegated to the Ghana Division One League.

Medeama SC 
On 26 October 2020, Medeama SC announced that Musah had signed on a free transfer. He signed a three-year deal with the club to expire in 2023. He made his debut on 12 December 2020, in a 1–0 victory over Ebusua Dwarfs, coming on in the 48th minute for Daniel Egyin.

References

External links 

 

Living people
1996 births
Association football defenders
Ghanaian footballers
Tema Youth players
Ghana Premier League players
F.C. Nania players